Pennacchio is a surname. Notable people with the surname include:

Joseph Pennacchio (born 1955), American Republican Party politician
Len A. Pennacchio, American molecular biologist
Salvatore Pennacchio (born 1952), Catholic archbishop and diplomat of the Holy See

See also:
Pennacchi (surname)